Andreas Dress (born 26 August 1938) is a German mathematician specializing in geometry, combinatorics and mathematical biology.

Dress earned his PhD from the University of Kiel in 1962, under the supervision of Friedrich Bachmann and Karl-Heinrich Weise. His thesis is entitled Konstruktion metrischer Ebenen.

He has been a professor of mathematics at the University of Bielefeld since 1969. In 1998 he was an Invited Speaker of the International Congress of Mathematicians in Berlin.

See also
Split networks
SplitsTree
T-theory
Tight span

References 

Living people
1938 births
20th-century German mathematicians
University of Kiel alumni
Academic staff of Bielefeld University